Mścięcino - a district of Police, Poland, town in the Pomerania Region.

Communication
Roads:
from the centre of Police to Przęsocin and Szczecin
Main streets in a district:
ul. Asfaltowa 
ul. Cisowa
Szczecin - Police - Trzebież Railway
Public transport:
 bus lines 101 (to the Old Town of Police, Przęsocin and a centre of Szczecin), 102 (to the Old Town and the New Town of Police and Szczecin-Skolwin and Szczecin-Gocław), 107 (to the New Town of Police, Przęsocin and a centre of Szczecin)

See also
Police, Poland

Police, West Pomeranian Voivodeship